Local elections were held in Kosovo on 17 October 2021. Only 17 municipalities elected a mayor in the first round, and 21 will vote again on 14 November 2021. In Elez Han, the election was seriously hampered by election fraud, and a second ballot will be held in October/November 2021. On 25 October 2021, the Supreme Court annulled the decision for re-vote in Elez Han.

Electoral system 
The Mayor and the  members of the Assembly will be elected by open list proportional representation, with seats reserved for national minorities, in each Kosovo municipalities

Parties and coalitions  

The Central Election Commission has certified for municipal elections on October 17, 48 political subjects, of which 18 political parties, one coalition, 17 civic initiatives and 12 independent candidates.

Mayoral results

Results of 1st round

Deçan

Dragash

Ferizaj

Gjakova

Gjilan

Drenas

Gračanica

Elez Han

Fushë Kosova

Istog

Junik

Kaçanik

Kamenicë

Klina

Klokot

Leposavić

Lipjan

Mališevo

Mamuša

Mitrovica

North Mitrovica

Novo Brdo

Obilić

Rahovec

Parteš

Pejë

Prishtina

Prizren

Podujevë

Ranilug

Skenderaj

Štrpce

Shtime

Suhareka

Vitia

Vushtrri

Zubin Potok

Zvečan

Results of 2nd round

Dragash

Gjakova

Gjilan

Drenas

Istog

Junik

Kaçanik

Kamenicë

Klina

Klokot

Fushë Kosova

Malishevë

Mamuša

Obilić

Rahovec

Prishtina

Prizren

Podujevë

Shtime

Vitia

Vushtrri

Opinion polls

Gjakova

Gjilan

Istog

Peja

Prizren

Vushtrria

References

External links

Local elections in Kosovo
L
L